The 1999 Aïn Témouchent earthquake occurred on December 22 at  in northern Algeria. The dip-slip event had a moment magnitude of 5.6 and a maximum Mercalli intensity of VII (Very strong). At least 22 were killed, 175 were injured, and 15,000 were homeless. The Belgian Centre for Research on the Epidemiology of Disasters' EM-DAT database and the USGS' National Geophysical Data Center both list financial losses of $60.93 million.

See also
List of earthquakes in 1999
List of earthquakes in Algeria

References

Further reading

External links
M5.6 – northern Algeria – United States Geological Survey

1999 earthquakes
1999 in Algeria
Aïn Témouchent Province
Earthquakes in Algeria
Buried rupture earthquakes
1999 disasters in Algeria